Lewis Watson, 1st Earl of Rockingham (29 December 1655 – 19 March 1724) was an English peer and politician. He was the eldest son of Edward Watson, 2nd Baron Rockingham (1630 – 1689) and Anne Wentworth, daughter of Thomas Wentworth, 1st Earl of Strafford.

In 1681–1685, Watson was Whig Member of Parliament for Canterbury and for Higham Ferrers briefly in 1689, before having to leave the Commons on inheriting his father's barony that year.

Lord Rockingham was Master of the Buckhounds in 1703–1705, Custos Rotulorum and Lord Lieutenant of Kent in 1705–1724, Vice-Admiral of Kent in 1705 and Deputy Warden of the Cinque Ports in 1705–1708. In 1714, he was created Earl of Rockingham.

In July 1677, he married Catherine Sondes (d. 1696), a daughter of George Sondes, 1st Earl of Feversham. They had five surviving children:

Edward, styled Viscount Sondes (c. 1687 – Kensington, 20 March 1722), married on 21 March 1708 Lady Catherine Tufton (24 April 1693 – 13 February 1733), daughter of Thomas Tufton, 6th Earl of Thanet and Lady Catherine Cavendish, parents of the 2nd and 3rd Earls of Rockingham and Catherine Watson (d. April 1765), who married Edward Southwell and had Edward Southwell, 20th Baron de Clifford.
Hon. George (24 May 1689 – 1735)
Lady Margaret (1695–1751), married John Monson, 1st Baron Monson.
Lady Mary (d. 1737), married Wray Saunderson.
Lady Arabella, married Sir Robert Furnese, 2nd Baronet.

His wife died on 21 March 1696 and was buried at Rockingham. He died on 19 march 1724 and was buried 1 April at Rockingham. He was succeeded by his  grandson, Lewis.

References

Sources

External links
Rockingham Castle

|-

Earls in the Peerage of Great Britain
Lord-Lieutenants of Kent
Watson, Lewis
1655 births
1724 deaths
Politics of Canterbury
English MPs 1681
English MPs 1689–1690